Charles Morgan "of Dderw" (1736 – 24 May 1787) was a Welsh politician who sat in the House of Commons between 1763 and 1787.

Morgan was the second son of Thomas Morgan and his wife, Jane Colchester. He married Mary Gough, widow of Robert Myners Gough and daughter of Thomas Parry, but had no children by her.

In 1763, Morgan was returned as Member of Parliament for Brecon, succeeding his elder brother Thomas. He was Bailiff of Brecon in 1768, and a lieutenant in the Foot Guards 1769. That year he accepted the Stewardship of the Manner of East Hendred to succeed his late father in a by-election at Breconshire, which he represented until his death.

In 1771, he inherited the Tredegar estate from his elder brother, Sir Thomas Morgan, and succeeded him as Lord Lieutenant of Brecknockshire. The castle on Morgan's estate at Rhiwpera burned down in 1783, and rebuilding was not completed until after his death.

He died on 24 May 1787. His estates went to his younger brother, John Morgan.

References

1736 births
1787 deaths
British Army officers
British MPs 1761–1768
British MPs 1768–1774
British MPs 1774–1780
British MPs 1780–1784
British MPs 1784–1790
Lord-Lieutenants of Brecknockshire
Members of the Parliament of Great Britain for Welsh constituencies